Gomo is a video game developed by Slovak company Fishcow Studio. It is a Point-and-click adventure game.

Gameplay 
The game is a typical point-and-click adventure game with hand-drawn graphics. It also includes some puzzles to solve. The game is inspired by Amanita Design titles such as Machinarium. It also means that the story is told without words.

Plot 
The game follows Gomo whose dog Dingo is kidnapped by an alien. The alien demands a mystical red crystal artifact that is imbued with power.

Reception 
The game received middling reviews. It holds 50% on Metacritic. The game was criticised for its length, low difficulty, story and a low diversity of worlds. On the other hand, it was praised for its visuals.

External links 
Official site

References 

2013 video games
Alien abduction in video games
Point-and-click adventure games
Windows games
MacOS games
Video games about dogs
Video games developed in Slovakia
Indie video games